Free Reformed Churches may refer to the following churches associated with the Reformed Churches in the Netherlands (Liberated):

Free Reformed Churches of Australia
Free Reformed Churches of South Africa

It may also refer to the unrelated
Free Reformed Churches of North America
Free Reformed Church of Germany (episcopal)
Free Reformed Church of Poland (progressive Calvinism)